IMI may refer to:

Companies and organizations
 IMI plc, a British engineering company
 IMI Systems, an Israeli weapons manufacturer
 Indian Music Industry, a trust that represents the recording industry distributors in India
 Indonesian Motor Association
 Institute of Mathematics and Informatics (Bulgarian Academy of Sciences)
 Institute of the Motor Industry, UK
 Integrated Micro-Electronics, Inc., a semiconductor maker in the Philippines
 International Hotel Management Institute Switzerland
 International Maritime Institute, India
 International Migration Institute, at Oxford University
 International Mycological Institute, England
 Irish Management Institute
 Israel Music Institute

Other
 IMI Desert Eagle, a semi-automatic handgun
 Inclusive Mosque Initiative, UK
 Innovative Medicines Initiative, a partnership of the European Union
 Internal Market Information System, network that links public bodies in the European Economic Area
 International Migration Initiative, of the Open Society Foundation
 Italian military internees, name given by Germany to captured Italian soldiers
 "iMi", a song from the album I, I by American folk band Bon Iver

See also 
 International Management Institute (disambiguation)
 Imi, Ethiopia
 Imi, a Babylonian king
 IMI, abbreviation for "I say again" in morse code: ..--..